Antonio Ruiz-Rosales (born 18 September 1984) is a Mexican tennis player.

Ruiz-Rosales has a career high ATP singles ranking of 652 achieved on 15 December 2008. He also has a career high ATP doubles ranking of 473 achieved on 12 October 2009.

Ruiz-Rosales represents Mexico at the Davis Cup, where he has a W/L record of 0–1.

External links

1984 births
Living people
Mexican male tennis players
Sportspeople from Monterrey
Georgia Bulldogs tennis players